Kaarel Pürg (born 2 October 1949) is an Estonian politician. He was a member of X Riigikogu.

Pürg was born in Tuhalaane./ He is a member of Estonian Centre Party.

References

Living people
1949 births
Members of the Riigikogu, 2003–2007
Place of birth missing (living people)
Date of birth missing (living people)
Estonian Centre Party politicians
People from Mulgi Parish